Five Forks is an unincorporated community in Calhoun County, West Virginia, United States. It lies along West Virginia Route 16 to the north of the town of Grantsville, the county seat of Calhoun County. The Five Forks Post Office  is closed.

References

External links

Unincorporated communities in Calhoun County, West Virginia
Unincorporated communities in West Virginia